Barbara Leoff Burge is an American book artist. In 1974 she co-founded the Women's Studio Workshop (WSW) in Rosendale, New York along with fellow artists Ann Kalmbach, Tatana Kellner, and Anita Wetzel.  Her work is in the Metropolitan Museum of Art, and the MassArt Library.

In 2013 she was honored at the Women's Studio Workshop annual Gala Dinner. In 2018 she was included in the exhibit The Golden Age of New Paltz which exhibited New Paltz artists of the 1960s.

References

External links
An interview with Babs

Living people
20th-century American women artists
Women book artists
Book artists